Ramiro Iván Rocca (born 22 November 1988) is an Argentine professional footballer who plays as a forward for Real España.

Career
At the age of 16, Rocca joined the youth academy of Argentine top flight side Newell's, where he said, "at first it was difficult for me to adapt, like every kid from a small town, later when I found a taste for the city, I started with problems of the 18-year-old kid who is in the foolishness and that's why they let me free".

In 2013, he signed for Sportivo Rivadiavia in the Argentine fourth division.

In 2018, Rocca signed for Salvadoran club Chalatenango.

Before the second half of 2018–19, he signed for Iztapa in Guatemala.

On 29 November 2020, he scored four goals for Municipal during a 6–0 win over Iztapa.

Rocca was the top Argentine scorer in top flights worldwide during 2020.

In 2021, he signed for Honduran team Real España, where he said "it is a pity that in a country where it is very rich in players they have bad playing fields".

Honours
Individual
CONCACAF League Golden Boot: 2022

References

External links
 
 

Living people
1988 births
Argentine footballers
Association football forwards
Real C.D. España players
C.S.D. Municipal players
Deportivo Iztapa players
Central Córdoba de Rosario footballers
Argentine expatriate footballers
Argentine expatriate sportspeople in Guatemala
Expatriate footballers in Guatemala
Argentine expatriate sportspeople in Honduras
Expatriate footballers in Honduras
Argentine expatriate sportspeople in El Salvador
Expatriate footballers in El Salvador